The 1936 United States presidential election in Missouri took place on November 3, 1936, as part of the 1936 United States presidential election. Voters chose 15 representatives, or electors, to the Electoral College, who voted for president and vice president.

Missouri was won by incumbent President Franklin D. Roosevelt (D–New York), running with Vice President John Nance Garner, with 60.76% of the popular vote, against Governor Alf Landon (R–Kansas), running with Frank Knox, with 38.16% of the popular vote.

Results

Results by county

See also
 United States presidential elections in Missouri

Notes

References

Missouri
1936
1936 Missouri elections